In music, Op. 81 stands for Opus number 81. Compositions that are assigned this number include:

 Beethoven – Piano Sonata No. 26
 Beethoven – Sextet for Horns and String Quartet
 Brahms – Tragic Overture
 Dvořák – Piano Quintet No. 2
 Elgar – The Sanguine Fan
 Milhaud – La création du monde
 Prokofiev – Semyon Kotko
 Sallinen – Symphony No. 8
 Schumann – Genoveva
 Shostakovich – Song of the Forests
 Strauss – Friedenstag